uCoz is a free web hosting with a built-in content management system. The modules of the uCoz CMS can be used together to build a fully featured website, or separately, e.g. as an online shopping platform, blog, webforum etc. As of July 10, 2015, there are more than one and a half million websites created in the uCoz system. uCoz is among the top sites for Russian-speaking users according to Alexa Internet.

History

Initially, the basis of the service development was formed by the combined experience of several developers, which consisted in previous work over different services such as polls, free guestbooks and, more importantly, a professional CMS script (WoCatalog Pro). On 29 October 2005, after almost a year of development, uCoz announced the Russian version of the system. In June 2007, the English version of the system was officially announced, and in August the German version. Currently, uCoz is also available in Azeri, Spanish, French, Arabic, Hungarian, Romanian, Swedish, Polish, Portuguese, partially in Hebrew, Latvian, Ukrainian, and Georgian languages.

In January 2013, Yandex, the 4th largest Search Engine in the world announced the transfer to uCoz for its project Narod. This was the 2nd largest free website hosting platform on the Russian Internet, and the merger increased uCoz's market share substantially, as the company was already the market leader before the merger.

uCoz is backed by the Mail.ru group, has its headquarters in Moscow, Russia and other offices in Saint Petersburg, Rostov on Don, Kazan and Cherkassy, Ukraine.

Peculiarities

Being a SaaS system, uCoz has the features of this type of platform like closed source code, but with the availability of running server-side scripts like JavaScript. Also, it has the unavailability of running databases (all this is possible within Web 3.0 PaaS concept), which is balanced out by a great number of built-in system capabilities. Also, the system is fully HTML5 and CSS3 compatible.

Awards

 Open Web Awards 2009 winner in the nomination Best Site for Publishers
 Runet Prize 2008 People's Ten
 Runet Prize 2009 Technologies and Innovations
 Content Management Award Winners 2009
 Web Host Directory September 2008 Best for Ecommerce

References

External links

Companies based in Moscow
Content management systems
Free web hosting services
Internet technology companies of Russia
Website management
Blog hosting services